Start with Why: How Great Leaders Inspire Everyone to Take Action is a book by Simon Sinek.

Overview
The book starts with comparing the two main ways to influence human behaviour: manipulation and inspiration. Sinek argues that inspiration is the more powerful and sustainable of the two. The book primarily discusses the significance of leadership and purpose to succeed in life and business. Sinek highlights the importance of taking the risk and going against the status-quo to find solutions to global problems. He believes leadership holds the key to inspiring a nation to come together and advance a common interest to make a nation, or the planet, a more civilised place. He turns to Dr. Martin Luther King Jr, John F Kennedy, Steve Jobs and the entire Apple culture as examples of how a purpose can be created to inspire a culture together, away from the manipulative society we live in today.

The golden circle

Sinek says people are inspired by a sense of purpose (or "Why"), and that this should come first when communicating, before "How" and "What". Sinek calls this triad the golden circle, a diagram of a bullseye (or concentric circles or onion diagram) with "Why" in the innermost circle (representing people's motives or purposes), surrounded by a ring labelled "How" (representing people's processes or methods), enclosed in a ring labelled "What" (representing results or outcomes). He speculates about the biological factors behind this structure, such as the limbic system.

Reception 
Lindsay McGregor and Neel Doshi, co-authors of the book Primed to Perform: How to Build the Highest Performing Cultures Through the Science of Total Motivation, came to a similar conclusion: "Why we work determines how well we work."

Ken Krogue, in a blog post for Forbes, argued that it is far more important, especially for salespeople, to find the right person (which Krogue called "starting with Who") before "starting with Why":

Sales 
According to NPD BookScan's mid-June 2016 to mid-June 2017 ranking of printed book sales, Start with Why ranked (without disclosing the geographical region) as the "bestselling leadership book" of that period, selling 171,000 paperback copies.

See also
 Five Ws
 Onion model
  In the 1970s Terry Borton popularized the triad "What?", "So what?", and "Now what?"
 The Infinite Game

References

Business books
2009 non-fiction books